Eucalyptus viridis, commonly known as the green mallee, is a species of mallee or small tree that is endemic to south-eastern, continental Australia. It has rough fibrous or flaky bark on the lower trunk, smooth bark above, linear to narrow lance-shaped adult leaves, flower buds in groups of seven or nine, white flowers and cup-shaped fruit.

Description
It has rough, dark grey, fibrous or flaky bark on the lower stems, smooth greyish brown above, or sometimes entirely smooth bark. Flowering has been observed in most months and the flowers are white.

Taxonomy and naming
Eucalyptus viridis was first formally described in 1900 by Richard Thomas Baker in the Proceedings of the Linnean Society of New South Wales. The specific epithet (viridis) is a Latin word meaning "green".

Distribution and habitat
The green mallee grows in mallee shrubland on plains and gently undulating country. It occurs in Queensland, mainly south from Taroom, through the western slopes and plains of New South Wales, near Bendigo and in the Little Desert National Park in Victoria to the south east of South Australia.

Uses
This eucalypt is important in the production of honey and the leaves are harvested for cineole based eucalyptus oil.

See also
 List of Eucalyptus species

References

viridis
Flora of Queensland
Flora of New South Wales
Flora of Victoria (Australia)
Flora of South Australia
Myrtales of Australia
Mallees (habit)
Plants described in 1900
Taxa named by Richard Thomas Baker